Semirâma is an opera in three acts by Ottorino Respighi to a libretto by Alessandro Cerè based on Voltaire's 1748 play Sémiramis, the same subject used for Rossini's Semiramide. Semirâma premiered on 20 November 1910 at the Teatro Comunale di Bologna. The première obtained a great success, with several calls for the composer and the singers.

In this opera, which often exploits the exotic cues offered by the subject, it is possible to find influences of Salome by Richard Strauss.

Roles

Instrumentation
Semirâma is scored for the following instruments:

piccolo, 2 flutes , 2 oboes, English horn, E-flat clarinet, 2 clarinets, 2 bassoons, double bassoon, 6 horns, 3 trumpets, 3 trombones, bass tuba, timpani, triangle, sistrum, cymbals, celesta, bass drum, xylophone, tam-tam, harp, strings

On stage: 2 oboes, harp, sistrum

Synopsis
Place: Babylon

Act 1: The return
An unknown but brave warrior, Merôdach, returns home after victorious combats. The queen Semirâma, lover of the tetrarch Falâsar, who several years before to conquer the woman had her husband killed and her son Ninya banished, becomes infatuated with the mysterious hero. Merôdach, after his arrival, meets Susiâna, a woman that was a close friend of his during their childhood. They remind their old friendship, but the passion of Semirâma looms over them.

Act 2: The response
Falâsar, afraid of losing Semirâma, consults the wizard Ormus. Semirâma announces clearly to Falâsar that she intends to marry Merôdach. Falâsar tries to convince Semirâma that Merôdach is her own son Ninya, returning from exile as a valiant soldier, but Semirâma does not believe him. The response of Ormus is ominous.

Act 3: The matricide
The wedding between Semirâma and Merôdach is about to take place. Susiâna, informed by Falâsar of the true identity of Merôdach, reveals the story to her old friend. Merôdach thinks this is a slander and tries to kill Falâsar, but in the darkness instead of striking the tetrarch kills his own mother.

Recordings

References

Operas
Italian-language operas
1910 operas
Operas by Ottorino Respighi
Operas based on plays
Operas based on works by Voltaire
Operas set in Mesopotamia
Babylon in fiction